Haslett is a census-designated place (CDP) in Ingham County in the U.S. state of Michigan.  It is located mostly within Meridian Charter Township with a small portion extending east into Williamstown Township.  The population was 19,220 at the 2010 census.  Haslett contains its own school district, as well as its own post office with the 48840 ZIP Code.

History

Haslett is named after James and Sarah Haslett, a couple who founded the Nemoka Spiritualist Camp on the shore of Pine Lake (Original name for Lake Lansing).  By the later 1800s, thousands of spiritualists descended on Haslett Park for summer meetings, readings, lectures, and seances.  Mr. Haslett had hoped to establish his camp as the National Headquarters for the spiritualist movement.  His untimely death in 1891 and the decline of the spiritualist movement cause his widow to sell the land to the Haslett Park Association in 1898.  The new owners transformed the land into a summer recreational destination, and eventually, a figure-8 wooden roller coaster and other carnival rides were added, thus establishing what became known as Lake Lansing Amusement Park. With the railroad established, the Lansing Trolley line added rails so that people could travel from the state capital, Lansing, to the new recreation center.  Holding to this tradition, Haslett is host to Lake Lansing Parks North and South as well as a portion of the Inter-Urban Pathway and numerous other small parks and recreation facilities.

The city of Haslet, Texas, is named after Haslett, Michigan (note that the Texas community is spelled with one 't'). The Texas town of Haslet received its name from a railroad worker who relocated to Texas from Michigan in the late 1800s.

Geography

Haslett is in northern Ingham County and is bordered by the city of East Lansing to the west and the unincorporated community of Okemos to the south. Haslett is bordered to the north by Clinton County and Shiawassee County. Business Loop I-69 (East Saginaw Street) runs through the northwest part of Haslett, leading northeast to Interstate 69 in Clinton County and west into Lansing.

Haslett is most notable for being the home of Lake Lansing. The Michigan State University Sailing Club and Lansing Sailing Club are located on Lake Lansing. From 1934 until 1974, an amusement park operated near the lake and featured a wooden roller coaster at the site that is now Lake Lansing Park South. In 2007, Business Week ranked Haslett 42nd on their list of "Best Places to Raise Your Kids".

Demographics

As of the census of 2000, there were 11,283 people, 5,132 households, and 2,884 families residing in the CDP. The racial makeup of the CDP was 92.37% White, 2.39% Black or African American, 0.30% Native American, 2.71% Asian, 0.03% Pacific Islander, 0.73% from other races, and 1.47% from two or more races. Hispanic or Latino of any race were 2.48% of the population.

There were 5,132 households, out of which 28.4% had children under the age of 18 living with them, 43.5% were married couples living together, 9.9% had a female householder with no husband present, and 43.8% were non-families. 35.7% of all households were made up of individuals, and 11.4% had someone living alone who was 65 years of age or older.  The average household size was 2.19 and the average family size was 2.90.

In the CDP, the population was spread out, with 23.3% under the age of 18, 9.5% from 18 to 24, 30.4% from 25 to 44, 25.2% from 45 to 64, and 11.6% who were 65 years of age or older.  The median age was 38 years. For every 100 females, there were 85.9 males.  For every 100 females age 18 and over, there were 82.3 males.

The median income for a household in the CDP was $50,679, and the median income for a family was $69,806. Males had a median income of $51,637 versus $35,786 for females. The per capita income for the CDP was $28,686.  About 4.8% of families and 7.1% of the population were below the poverty line, including 7.6% of those under age 18 and 7.8% of those age 65 or over.

Education
Most of Haslett is in Haslett Public Schools. Portions are in Okemos Public Schools East Lansing Public Schools, and Williamston Community Schools. Respective senior high schools include Okemos High School and East Lansing High School.

References

External links
Haslett Public Schools

Unincorporated communities in Ingham County, Michigan
Census-designated places in Michigan
Lansing–East Lansing metropolitan area
Unincorporated communities in Michigan
Census-designated places in Ingham County, Michigan